The Pennsylvania Auto Show is an annual auto show held in Harrisburg, Pennsylvania at the Pennsylvania Farm Show Complex & Expo Center.

Show info
The show is operated by Motor Trend and is sponsored annually by the Harrisburg Automotive Trade Association and The Patriot-News, the region's largest daily newspaper. The Antique Automobile Club of America displays a variety of classic and original cars from its museum located in nearby Hershey, Pennsylvania. Other private automobile collections are on display as well boats and RVs/campers. In 2010 the all-new certified pre-owned showcase was added to the show.

See also
 List of auto shows and motor shows by continent

References

External links
 Official site

Culture of Harrisburg, Pennsylvania
Auto shows in the United States
Tourist attractions in Harrisburg, Pennsylvania